The 1987 NCAA Division III football season, part of the college football season organized by the NCAA at the Division III level in the United States, began in August 1987, and concluded with the NCAA Division III Football Championship, also known as the Stagg Bowl, in December 1987 at Garrett-Harrison Stadium in Phenix City, Alabama.

Wagner won their first Division III championship by defeating Dayton in the championship game, 19−3. Due to NCAA rule changes in 1991, both schools are now members Football Championship Subdivision (formerly I-AA).

Conference changes and new programs

Conference standings

Conference champions

Postseason
The 1987 NCAA Division III Football Championship playoffs were the 15th annual single-elimination tournament to determine the national champion of men's NCAA Division III college football. The championship Stagg Bowl game was held at Garrett-Harrison Stadium in Phenix City, Alabama for the 13th time and for the third consecutive year. Like the previous two tournaments, this year's bracket featured sixteen teams.

Playoff bracket

See also
1987 NCAA Division I-A football season
1987 NCAA Division I-AA football season
1987 NCAA Division II football season

References